Yaroshchuk or Yaroschuk is a gender-neutral Ukrainian surname. Notable people with the surname include:

Hanna Ryzhykova (born Yaroshchuk in 1989), Ukrainian sprinter
Vadim Yaroshchuk (born 1966), Soviet swimmer

Ukrainian-language surnames